David James Richards  (born 13 November 1970) is a British Silicon Valley entrepreneur and technology executive. He currently serves as the co-founder and CEO of WANdisco, an Anglo-American software company specialising in distributed computing.

Biography
He was born in Sheffield, England in 1970, where his father worked in the steel industry. Graduating with a degree in computer science from the University of Huddersfield in 1992, he became an early member of the team at Druid Group.

In the mid-1990s, Richards formed a SAP consulting company, which he sold in the late 1998 and moved to Silicon Valley. Raising $25m from venture capital, he founded business software company Insevo before creating Librados, which was acquired by Netmanage in 2004.

WANdisco was incorporated in 2005 after a chance meeting between Richards and WANdisco chief scientist, Dr. Yeturu Aahlad. Richards recognized the potential of Aahlad's invention, and the two decided to create a company without the use of venture capital or angel investors.  In June 2012, the company was floated on the London Stock Exchange.

Philanthropy 
In 2017, Richards and his wife Jane donated stock valued at $1.5 million to create the charitable David and Jane Richards Family Foundation to educate, empower and improve the lives of children.

Richards cited frustration at the UK Government's efforts to teach computing skills to schoolchildren and consequently a lack of adequate skills in a future economy where artificial intelligence and automation are prevalent.  He said "You can’t have all this money and hold on to it or buy a football team. There’s only so many houses you can live in. I think it’s better to do something good for the world."

During the COVID-19 pandemic Richards co-founded Laptops For Kids, a charitable organisation to facilitate the donation, secure erasure, and distribution of used digital devices, enabling children from disadvantaged backgrounds to have access to the technology they need to participate in remote learning. He said "nearly one in 10 children living in households with no access to a laptop, desktop or tablet computer, the shift towards remote learning during the pandemic has excluded up to 1.77m young people from active schooling. No access equals no education. I am not prepared to let this injustice go unchallenged."

Awards and honours
Richards was appointed Member of the Order of the British Empire (MBE) in the 2022 New Year Honours for services to the information technology sector and young people, particularly during Covid-19.

He was awarded an honorary doctorate from The University of Sheffield (2023) for giving distinguished service or bringing distinction to the University, the City of Sheffield, or the region.

He was awarded an honorary doctorate from Sheffield Hallam University (2017) in recognition of him being a champion of British technology and a passionate advocate of entrepreneurship.

References

External links
WANdisco
The David and Jane Richards Family Foundation
The Laptops For Kids

1970 births
Living people
English chief executives
Businesspeople from Sheffield
People educated at Tapton School
Alumni of the University of Huddersfield
Members of the Order of the British Empire